Martin Van Geneugden (21 January 1932 – 8 July 2014) was a Belgian professional road bicycle racer from 1953 to 1963. He won 6 stages in the Tour de France.

Major results

1950
 national amateur road race champion
1953
Jemeppe
Velaines
Winterslag
Paris - Valenciennes
Tour de France:
Winner stage 6
1954
Houthalen-Helchteren
1955
Houthalen-Helchteren
Tongeren
1956
Borgerhout
Denderleeuw
Zutendaal
1957
Hoegaarden - Antwerpen - Hoegaarden
Hanret
Tienen
1958
Eijsden
GP Fichtel & Sachs
Hasselt
Tour de France
Winner stages 5 and 12
Omloop van Midden-België
1959
Hoepertingen
1960
Tour de France
Winner stages 9 and 14
Omloop van de fruitstreek Alken
Omloop van Limburg
1961
Tour de France
Winner stage 18
Omloop van de fruitstreek Alken
Omloop van Limburg
1962
Dwars door Vlaanderen
1963
Eijsden
Nandrin

References

External links 

Belgian male cyclists
1932 births
2014 deaths
Belgian Tour de France stage winners
Cyclists from Limburg (Belgium)
People from Zutendaal